Unpretty Rapstar is a 2015 South Korean music competition program focusing on female rappers. The show, a spin-off of Show Me the Money, premiered in January 2015 on Mnet and was hosted by Korean rapper San E. In August 2015, it was confirmed that the show would begin airing its second season on September 11, 2015. The winner in Season 1 was Cheetah.

Season Overview 
Original Airdate:

Contestants 
Winner: Cheetah (SMTM contestant)
First runner-up: Jessi (former Lucky J member)
Second runner-up:  Yuk Ji-dam (SMTM3 contestant, Unpretty Rapstar 3 contestant)
Semi-finalists: 
 Kisum (SMTM3 contestant)
 Jimin (former AOA member)
 Jolly V (SMTM3 contestant)
Eliminated contestants:
 Tymee (SMTM3 contestant) (Eliminated in episode 6)
 Jace of Miss $ (Joined in episode 4, eliminated in episode 6)
 Lil Cham (Eliminated in episode 4)

Competition events

Self-introduction through a cypher 
An ice-breaker where all contestants and the host do a rap for their self-introduction, using the same beat. The rappers are allowed to initiate or respond to pre-game diss battles.

One-take video mission 
The first mission in all seasons of Unpretty Rapstar was contestants collaborating with judges, producers, and fellow contestants to create a music video for an original rap song. The video is mostly filmed in one unedited take, and the rappers must also write and arrange the song. After the filming of the music video for the song is complete, the rappers vote for who did the best and worst, in a fully disclosed process. The winner of the mission receives an advantage for the next challenge or the next part of the track missions. Whoever is voted last by their fellow rappers receives a penalty of being excluded from the next mission, or from the song that was produced through the one-take mission.

Diss Battles 
A series of one-on-one rap battles where the contestants put one another down through diss rap. Unlike rap battles in Show Me the Money, these are closed events with no MCs.

Discography

See also 
 Unpretty Rapstar 2
 Unpretty Rapstar 3

References

External links
 

1
2015 South Korean television series debuts
2015 South Korean television series endings
Korean-language television shows
South Korean music television shows
Mnet (TV channel) original programming
Rapping
South Korean women rappers
Hip hop television